"Walk Away" is  the second single and ninth track from the Funeral for a Friend album Tales Don't Tell Themselves, and reached number 40 in the UK Charts.

Music video
The video is about a fisherman who goes missing. It follows his wife and daughter both breaking down. The video ends with the mother realising she cannot go on like this and trying to continue with her life. There are also scenes of Davies singing on a couch.

The video was filmed on location in the town of Whitstable on the north Kent coast in April 2007. The interior scenes were shot in another house on the seafront, not the house shown on the external shot.

Track listing
CD (ATUK068CD):
"Walk Away"
"In A Manner Of Sleep (Home Demo)"

7" coloured vinyl / gatefold sleeve (ATUK068):
"Walk Away"
"Into Oblivion (Haunts Remix)"

7" shaped picture disc (ATUK068X):
"Walk Away"
"Africa (Home Demo)"

References

Funeral for a Friend songs
2007 singles
Wikipedia requested audio of songs
2007 songs
Atlantic Records singles